The 2019 Babergh District Council election took place on 2 May 2019 to elect members of Babergh District Council in England. This was on the same day as other local elections.

Summary

Election result

|-

Ward results

Assington

Box Vale

Brantham

Brett Vale

Bures St. Mary & Nayland

Capel St. Mary

Chadacre

Copdock & Washbrook

East Bergholt

Ganges

Great Cornard

Hadleigh North

Hadleigh South

Lavenham

Long Melford

North West Cosford

Orwell

South East Cosford

Sproughton & Pinewood

Stour

Sudbury North East

Sudbury North West

Sudbury South East

Sudbury South West

By-elections

Great Cornard

References

Babergh District Council elections